Murdoch McCormack (7 October 1920 – 22 April 1951) was a Scottish footballer, who played as a winger in the Football League for Manchester City, Blackpool and Crewe Alexandra.

After making only one League appearance for Manchester City, in 1946–47, McCormack joined Joe Smith's Blackpool the following season. He made eleven starts in the first fourteen League games, scoring twice in a 4–0 victory over Huddersfield Town at Bloomfield Road on 1 September, and Blackpool's goal in a 1–1 draw at Blackburn Rovers a fortnight later.

His final appearance for Blackpool came on 21 February, a single-goal defeat at Manchester City.

In the summer of 1948, he joined Crewe Alexandra, for whom he made 31 League appearances and scored three goals in his only season with the club.

References

Manchester City F.C. players
1920 births
1951 deaths
Rangers F.C. players
Association football wingers
Blackpool F.C. players
Crewe Alexandra F.C. players
English Football League players
Footballers from Glasgow
Scottish footballers